The Search for Signs of Intelligent Life in the Universe (1985) is a one-woman stage show written by Jane Wagner and starring Lily Tomlin, which won the Drama Desk Award for Unique Theatrical Experience and was turned into a film in 1991.

The show, Tomlin's second Broadway billing as a solo performer, follows Tomlin as she performs various characters or persona, all while wearing simple black pants and a white blouse. The show appears disparate at first, but becomes unified under the sensibility of the opening "bag lady" persona as the performance progresses. The show is often praised or considered controversial for its feminist material, most notably the compressed history of the feminist movement offered in Act 2. For her stage performance, Tomlin won a Tony, Drama Desk, and Outer Critics' Circle awards.

The film was directed by John Bailey and edited by Sally Menke, and stays true to the original stage performance, earning the Golden Space Needle Award at the Seattle International Film Festival. For her efforts on the film, Tomlin received a Funniest Actress in a Motion Picture American Comedy Awards, amongst other notable accolades.

Plot

Cast
Lily Tomlin as Trudy
Lily Tomlin as Agnus Angst
Lily Tomlin as herself
Lily Tomlin as Chrissy
Lily Tomlin as Kate
Lily Tomlin as Lud
Lily Tomlin as Marie
Lily Tomlin as Rick
Lily Tomlin as Brandy
Lily Tomlin as Tina
Lily Tomlin as Lyn
Lily Tomlin as Edie
Lily Tomlin as Marge

Revival
In the fall of 2021, the Shed announced plans for a revival starring Saturday Night Live cast member Cecily Strong and directed by Tony nominee Leigh Silverman. It would run from January to February 2022. This production with Cecily Strong played at the Mark Taper Forum in Los Angeles Sept 21, 2022 - October 23, 2022.

References

External links

1991 films
1991 comedy films
American films based on plays
Films directed by John Bailey
Monodrama
Plays for one performer
Films with screenplays by Jane Wagner
Works by Jane Wagner
American independent films
1991 directorial debut films
1990s English-language films
1990s American films